G. K. Bharad Institute of Engineering is a degree-awarding institution situated near Rajkot, Gujarat, India. It is affiliated to Gujarat Technological University in Ahmedabad and approved by the All India Council for Technical Education. It has departments of information technology, computer engineering, mechanical engineering, and civil engineering.

Departments
Information Technology
Computer Engineering
Mechanical Engineering
Civil Engineering
Electronics & Communication

Engineering colleges in Gujarat
Education in Rajkot
Educational institutions established in 2009
2009 establishments in Gujarat